William Atkinson (September 4, 1868 – February 1, 1939) was a political figure in British Columbia. He represented Chilliwack in the Legislative Assembly of British Columbia from 1928 to 1933 as a Conservative.

He was born in Whitby, Ontario, the son of Joseph Atkinson and Isabella Burns, and was educated in Seaforth. In 1917, Atkinson married Mabel C. Ross. He served in the provincial cabinet as Minister of Agriculture. Atkinson died in Chilliwack at the age of 70.

References 

1868 births
1939 deaths
British Columbia Conservative Party MLAs